TMA-2 may be:
 TMA-2 mine
 Soyuz TMA-2, a Russian space exploration mission
 2,4,5-trimethoxyamphetamine, a hallucinogenic drug
 Tycho Magnetic Anomaly-2, from 2001: A Space Odyssey